The Liga das Mulheres Republicanas (English: Republican Women's League) was a Portuguese feminist organisation founded in 1909 by Ana de Castro Osório and Adelaide Cabete. It split in 1912 after the refusal of the government to pass a law enabling women to vote. Cabete subsequently started the Conselho Nacional das Mulheres Portuguesas.

References 

Feminist organisations in Portugal
Women's suffrage in Portugal